Patria Vieja refers to a time period in the History of Chile occurring between the First Junta of the Government (September 18, 1810) and the Disaster of Rancagua (October 1, 1814). In this period, Chilean measures were taken for the imprisonment of Fernando VII of Spain by Napoleon and this started the governmental organization of the Kingdom of Chile, which swore fidelity to Ferdinand VII. 

This period was characterized by the transformation from a movement of temporary autonomy to one of total independence. Two things that stood out during this period were the political prominence of the Carrera brothers, especially José Miguel Carrera and the army battles headed by Bernardo O'Higgins as General. (Battle of Membrillar, Battle of Yerbas Buenas, and Battle of El Roble).

During this time a Government Junta of Chile as well as a National Congress were organized to administer the country during the imprisonment of the king. The Congress passed a law decreeing Liberty of the Womb, which stated that all children of slaves born on Chilean soil from that point onwards would be free. In 1812, the first constitutional decree was passed, which agreed to recognize the king if he accepted certain constitutional regulations.

Chilean War of Independence
1810 establishments in the Captaincy General of Chile
1814 disestablishments in the Captaincy General of Chile

References